Oklahoma was the name of one ship of the United States Navy and will be the name of a future submarine. 

 , a  launched in 1914 and sunk by Japanese bombers in the attack on Pearl Harbor 7 December 1941.
 , a planned Virginia-class nuclear attack submarine.

See also

United States Navy ship names